The Phom people, also known as the Phom Naga, are a Tibeto-Burmese Naga ethnic group inhabits the Northeast Indian state of Nagaland. Their traditional territory lies between the territories of Konyak in the north-east, the Ao in the west and the Chang in the south. Yongnyah is the largest Phom village.

Economy 

Agriculture is the traditional occupation of the Phoms. They practices jhum cultivation. The Phoms also have a tradition of pottery, bamboo work and spinning.

Origin 

The origin of the Phoms, like that of other Naga people, is uncertain. One oral tradition of the Phoms, like that of the Ao Nagas, states that their ancestors originated from stones. They also believe that their ancestors migrated to Mt. Yungnyü (a mountainous Hill in Longleng district) and from their separated to different villages.

Culture 
Phom's culture,tradition and language is closely related to the konyak nagas of Nagaland and the Wancho nagas in Arunachal Pradesh.

Clothing 

After the advent of Christianity, many modern Phoms have adopted contemporary clothing, though traditional dress is worn during festivals. The traditional Phom dressing was indicative of the social status of the wearer. The ordinary clothing included a white (vihe-ashak) or a dark blue (nempong-ashak) shawl-like body wrap. A man who had taken a head or offered feasts had the privilege to wear a cowrie-ornamented shawl (fanet-henyu). The women used to wear skirts called shung-nang, which came in different colors, designs and bands.

Practices 

Before arrival of Christianity, like the Konyaks and the Chang, they used to expose the dead bodies on raised platforms instead of burying them.

Festivals 

The Phoms have 4 major festivals, the most important of which is Monyü. The others are Moha, Bongvum and Paangmo.

Monyü 

Monyü is the most important traditional festival of the Phoms. It is a 12-day festival, which marks the end of winter and onset of summer (usually 1–6 April). The festival involves community feasting, dancing, singing and social work (such as repairs and construction of bridges). During the festival, the men present their married daughters or sisters with pure rice beer and special food to show their affection and respect.

One or two days before the festival, its arrival is signaled by beating log drums with a distinct tune called Lan Nyangshem. The priests or the village elders predict whether the festival would bring a blessing or a curse.

 Day 1 (Shongten-Laiphen)
 Overall preparation is done for the festivities. Households participate in collection of wrapping leaves and bamboos.

 Day 2
 Brewing of rice beer.

 Day 3 (Aiha Okshok)
 Feasting, dancing and merry-making.
The second day is for compulsory brewing of all kinds of rice beer.

 Day 4 (Chingi Okshok)
 General festivity and arrival of guests from neighbouring villages.

 Day 5 (Paangmohah)
 Parties of men wear colorful costumes and indulge in drinking, dancing and celebrating with friends.

 Day 6
 Elders feast by exchanging pure rice beer and meat. The young villagers feast together at the outskirts of the village.

References 

Naga people
People from Longleng district